Year 1075 (MLXXV) was a common year starting on Thursday (link will display the full calendar) of the Julian calendar.

Events 
 By place 

Africa
 The Kingdom of Mapungubwe is established, in modern-day South Africa.

Byzantine Empire
 The future Emperor Alexios Komnenos captures the Norman rebel Roussel de Bailleul in Amaseia. Roussel had established a principality in eastern Anatolia in 1073 after rebelling against Emperor Michael VII Doukas, basing his power on his western mercenaries and local support in exchange for protection against invading Turkmen.

 Europe 
 June 9 – First Battle of Langensalza: Emperor Henry IV defeats the Saxon nobles on the River Unstrut near Langensalza in Thuringia (modern Germany). He subjugates Saxony, and immediately tries to reassert his rights as the sovereign of northern Italy.
 Anund Gårdske is deposed as king of Svealand (also called Sweden proper). King Håkan the Red of Götaland proclaims himself ruler of all Sweden.

 England 
 Revolt of the Earls: The Earls Ralph de Gael, Roger de Breteuil and Waltheof, begin a revolt against King William I (the Conqueror) in the last serious act of resistance to the Norman Conquest.
 Roger de Breteuil is brought before the Great Council. He is deprived of his lands and sentenced to perpetual imprisonment. Ralph de Gael and Waltheof are charged as co-conspirators.
 August 25 – Council of London: Archbishop Lanfranc instigates the movement of English bishoprics. One of these is the bishopric of Sherborne and Wilton which is moved to Old Sarum.

 Asia 
 Summer – Shen Kuo, Chinese polymath scientist and statesman, solves a border dispute with the Liao Dynasty by dredging up old diplomatic records. He refutes Emperor Dao Zong's bluffs point for point during a meeting at Mt. Yongan (near modern-day Pingquan), reestablishing the rightful borders of the Song Dynasty.
 Vietnamese forces under General Lý Thường Kiệt defend Vietnam against a Chinese invasion.
 The Liao Dynasty version of the Buddhist Tripiṭaka is completed (approximate date).

 By topic 

 Religion 
 February – Pope Gregory VII holds a council in the Lateran Palace at Rome. He publishes a decree against laymen investiture (an act which will later cause the Investiture Controversy).
 April – The Dictatus papae (a compilation of 27 statements of powers) are include in the registry of Gregory VII, in which he asserts papal authority over earthly as well as spiritual rulers.
 December 8 – Gregory VII writes a letter of reprimand to Henry IV. He accuses him of breaching his word and continued support of excommunicated councilors.
 December 25 – Gregory VII is kidnapped in the church during Christmas night in Rome and briefly imprisoned by the Roman nobleman Cencio I Frangipane.

Births 
 March 18 – Al-Zamakhshari, Persian philosopher (d. 1144)
 April 16 – Orderic Vitalis, English Benedictine chronicler
 June 5 – Tianzuo (Yanning), last emperor of the Liao dynasty
 November 25 – Taizong, emperor of the Jin dynasty (d. 1135)
 Adelaide del Vasto, countess and regent of Sicily (d. 1118)
 Bertha, queen of Aragon and Navarre (approximate date)
 Conrad I, archbishop of Salzburg (approximate date)
 Frederick I, archbishop of Cologne (approximate date)
 Gerald de Windsor, English nobleman (approximate date) (d. 1135)
 Gim Busik, Korean statesman and general (d. 1151)
 Gisela of Burgundy, Marchioness of Montferrat, French noblewoman (d. 1135)
 Henry IX "the Black", duke of Bavaria (d. 1126)
 Jaya Pala, Indian king of Kamarupa (d. 1100)
 Jinadattasuri, Indian Jain poet and writer (d. 1154)
 Lothair III (or II) of Supplinburg, Holy Roman Emperor (d. 1137)
 Nicholas the Pilgrim, Italian shepherd and saint (d. 1094)
 Norbert of Xanten, archbishop of Magdeburg (d. 1134)
 Raymond Pilet d'Alès, French nobleman (d. 1120)
 Soběslav I (Sobeslaus), duke of Bohemia (d. 1140)
 Svatopluk "the Lion" of Olomouc, duke of Bohemia (d. 1109)
 Tancred, Italo-Norman leader of the First Crusade (d. 1112)

Deaths 
 March 29 – Ottokar I (or Otakar), German nobleman
 April 2 – Al-Qa'im, Abbasid caliph in Baghdad (b. 1001)
 April 15 – Erlembald Cotta, Italian military leader
 May 21 – Richeza (or Adelaide), Hungarian queen
 June 9 – Gebhard of Supplinburg, German nobleman
 June 10 – Ernest (the Brave), margrave of Austria (b. 1027)
 June 23 – Theodwin, prince-bishop of Liège
 August 2 – John VIII, patriarch of Constantinople
 August 27 – Minamoto no Yoriyoshi, Japanese nobleman (b. 988)
 November 6 – Fujiwara no Norimichi, Japanese nobleman (b. 996)
 December 4 – Anno II, archbishop of Cologne
 December 13 – Xiao Guanyin, Chinese empress (b. 1040)
 December 18 – Edith of Wessex, English queen
 Alī ibn Ahmad al-Nasawī, Persian mathematician
 Al-Mamun, Andalusian emir of the Taifa of Toledo
 Amhalgaidh mac Cathal, king of Maigh Seóla
 Anne of Kiev (or Agnes), French queen and regent
 Dedi I (or Dedo), margrave of the Saxon Ostmark
 Domnall mac Murchada, king of Leinster and Dublin 
 Frederick II, German nobleman and overlord (b. 1005)
 Gofraid mac Amlaíb meic Ragnaill, king of Dublin
 Gundekar II (or Gunzo), bishop of Eichstätt (b. 1019)
 Ibn Butlan, Arab Nestorian Christian physician (b. 1038)
 Ibn Hayyan, Moorish historian and writer (b. 987)
 John Xiphilinus, Byzantine historian (approximate date)
 Peter Krešimir IV (the Great), king of Croatia (or 1074)
 Rashid al-Dawla Mahmud, Mirdasid emir of Aleppo
 Siward (or Sigweard), bishop of Rochester

References